Queens County (2016 population 10,472) is located in central New Brunswick, Canada. The county shire town is the village of Gagetown.

Geography
The county's geography is dominated by the Saint John River and Grand Lake. Coal mining is a major industry in the Minto area.  Forestry and mixed farming dominate the rest of the county.  The CFB Gagetown military training area takes in a large portion of the western part of the county.

Census subdivisions

Communities
There are four municipalities within Queens County (listed by 2016 population):

Part of Minto lies within Sunbury County, but since most of it is in Queens County, Statistics Canada considers it as part of Queens.

Parishes
The county is subdivided into ten parishes (listed by 2016 population):

Demographics

Language

Transportation

Major Highways

Protected areas and attractions

Notable people

See also
List of communities in New Brunswick
Queens, New York

References

External links

Queens County Guide

 
Counties of New Brunswick